John F. "Jafsie" Condon (June 1, 1860 – January 2, 1945) was an American college football coach and school principal. He was the first head football coach at Fordham University, serving for one season, in 1883, and compiling a record of 3–5. He became the principal at a New York City public school and gained fame in 1932 as the person who paid the ransom in the Lindbergh kidnapping. 

Condon died of pneumonia, on January 2, 1945, at his home in The Bronx.

Head coaching record

References

1860 births
1945 deaths
American school principals
Fordham Rams football coaches
City College of New York alumni
Sportspeople from the Bronx
Coaches of American football from New York (state)
Educators from New York City
Deaths from pneumonia in New York City